Belli (translation: Silver) is a 2014 Indian Kannada drama film written and directed by Mussanje Mahesh. It stars Shiva Rajkumar and Kriti Kharbanda in the lead roles alongside an ensemble of Vinod Prabhakar, Orata Prashanth, Shishya Deepak and Venkatesh Prasad. The supporting cast features Sudha Rani, Aravinda Rao and Padma Vasanthi. The plot revolves around the journey of five friends in the Bangalore mafia.

Produced by H. R. Rajesh, filming commenced in March 2014. The cinematography was done by K. S. Chandrashekar and was edited by Deepu S. Kumar. The soundtrack was composed by V. Sridhar. The film opened to mixed reviews from critics upon theatrical release on 31 October 2014.

Plot
Belli alias Basavaraj (Shiva Rajkumar) migrates from his village to the city in search of a job. He falls into the trap of the underworld under the leadership of a don politician (Gurudutt) and earns good money. In a clash between rival gangs, Belli's boss is killed, prompting Belli to vow revenge against the killers. Meanwhile, Belli falls in love with Sneha (Kriti), the sister of a police officer. The plot proceeds to detail Belli's quest to win Sneha's love while he further descends into the depths of the criminal underworld.

Cast
 Shiva Rajkumar as Basavaraj "Belli"bekari 
 Kriti Kharbanda as Sneha
 Vinod Prabhakar as Babu
 Orata Prashanth as Srinivas
 Shishya Deepak as Ashwathnarayana Bhat
 Venkatesh Prasad as Rafi
 Adi Lokesh as Tabli Manja
 Padma Vasanthi as Basavaraj's mother
 Sudha Rani as Nidhi
 Chi. Guru Dutt
 Srinivasa Murthy
 Ramesh Bhat as a doctor
 B. V. Radha
 Aravinda Rao as ACP Pradeep Kumar
 Harish Rai as "Snake" Mohammed
 Saurav Lokesh 
 Nagaraj
 Honnavalli Krishna as Constable Krishna

Production
Mussanje Mahesh returned to direction with Belli after a three-year hiatus. He wanted to cast Shiva Rajkumar in his film titled Maha Shivaratri which "unfortunately, ... got shelved". He later narrated the story of Belli which Shiva liked and signed to play the eponymous lead. Mahesh said that Shiva's character would be seen "in three shades". Vinod Prabhakar, Prashanth, Deepak and Venkatesh Prasad were cast to play parallel leads alongside Shiva. It was reported in March 2014 that Kriti Kharbanda would play the female lead opposite Shiva.

Filming began on 19 March 2014 in Bangalore. A few days prior to the release Mahesh revealed that Shiva portrays a "mentally unstable character" in the film.

Reception
The film opened with average to negative reviews from critics who noted the plot's similarities to Shiva Rajkumar's films from the previous decade.

Soundtrack
The film's score and soundtrack were composed by V. Sridhar and the audio was created by Anand Audio. The audio was released on 28 September 2014 in the presence of the film's entire cast and crew. The event was held at a stadium in Bangalore. Minister D. K Shivakumar., also attended the event. The lyrics are written by Dr. Nagendra Prasad and Kaviraj.

References

External links
 

2014 films
2010s Kannada-language films
Indian gangster films
Indian action drama films
Indian nonlinear narrative films
Indian films about revenge
2014 action drama films
2010s vigilante films
Indian vigilante films